Galium arkansanum, the Arkansas bedstraw, is a plant species in the  Rubiaceae. It is native to the Ozark and Ouachita Mountains of Missouri, Arkansas and Oklahoma in the United States.

References

External links
Photo of herbarium specimen at Missouri Botanical Garden, collected in Missouri, Galium arkansanum
Missouri Plants
Gardening Europe

arkansanum
Flora of Oklahoma
Flora of Missouri
Flora of Arkansas
Plants described in 1883
Flora without expected TNC conservation status